A New Partnership Between the Indigenous Peoples and the Government of Taiwan is a treaty-like document signed in Orchid Island, Taiwan on 10 September 1999 by the representatives of the indigenous peoples of Taiwan and the then-presidential candidate Chen Shui-bian (who went on to win the 2000 presidential election for the Democratic Progressive Party).

The seven articles in the documents includes:
Recognizing the inherent sovereignty of Taiwan's Indigenous Peoples
Promoting autonomy for Indigenous Peoples
Concluding a land treaty with Taiwan's Indigenous Peoples
Reinstating traditional names of Indigenous communities and natural landmarks
Recovering traditional territories of Indigenous communities and Peoples
Recovering use of traditional natural resources and furthering the development of self-determination
Providing legislative (parliamentary) representation for each Indigenous People

The document later became the official indigenous policy for the DPP Government.  However, as the document was signed before Shui-bian Chen became the President, the efficacy of the document has been contested.

On 2002-10-19, Chen, as the head of state and government, reaffirmed the new partnership between indigenous nations and the Government of Taiwan in a ceremony with indigenous tribal representatives.

See also
 Taiwanese aborigines

Taiwanese aboriginal culture and history
Taiwan
Treaties concluded in 1999
Treaties of Taiwan
1999 in Taiwan